Abelardo Andrés Sztrum (born February 6, 1974) is an Argentine sprint canoer who competed from the mid-1990s to the early 2000s (decade). At the 1996 Summer Olympics in Atlanta, he was in semifinals of both the K-1 1000 m and the K-2 1000 m events. Four years later in Sydney, Sztrum was in the K-2 1000 m event.

Sztrum was the first Argentina's gold medalist in Pan American Games (Mar del Plata, 1995), the first World Cup Medalist (Poznan, 1997) the first Senior Finalist in World Championships (Dathmouth, 1997).

References

External links
 

1974 births
Living people
Argentine male canoeists
Olympic canoeists of Argentina
Canoeists at the 1996 Summer Olympics
Canoeists at the 2000 Summer Olympics
Pan American Games medalists in canoeing
Pan American Games gold medalists for Argentina
Canoeists at the 1995 Pan American Games
Argentine people of German descent
Medalists at the 1995 Pan American Games
20th-century Argentine people